Bandipotu Dongalu is a 1968 Indian Telugu-language action film, produced by J. Subba Rao and G. Rajendra Prasad, and directed by K. S. Prakash Rao. It stars Akkineni Nageswara Rao, Jamuna and S. V. Ranga Rao, with music composed by Pendyala Nageswara Rao.

Plot 
Raged Mallu Dora (S. V. Ranga Rao) revolts and builds a huge hamlet of dacoits who generate mayhem in the society through their heists. Once wounded Mallu Dora visits a Doctor, Chandra Shekar (Gummadi) where he is attracted to his infant son Krishna who gives remembrance of his deceased son Kanna and feels as if his son is reborn. So, one night he steals the baby and rears in their hamlet. Years roll by, Krishna grows up as Kanna (Akkineni Nageswara Rao) with several associates Naagu (Jaggaiah), Malli (Kanchana), Anji (Raja Babu) and becomes a deadly dacoit. Grief-stricken, Doctor & his wife Yashoda (Rukmini) raise their niece Indira / Indu (Jamuna). One day, Kanna ruthlessly robs Yashoda & Indu, on his way of back, hits with a Police encounter in which he is seriously injured. Police admit him in the hospital where Chandra Shekar recognizes him as his son by the mole of his back. Then he secretly makes his escape and hides from Police. Thereafter, Doctor reveals his birth secret also reforms him by preaching human values. At present, Kanna wants to start a new life as Krishna, so, he accommodates himself at Chandra Shekar's house without divulging his identity. There, Mallu Dora & other dacoits become distressed for missing Kanna and eagerly waiting for his arrival. Parallelly, Indu also learns the truth regarding Krishna and they fell in love. In a short span of time, civilized Krishna / Kanna reaches his hamlet, tries to convince Mallu Dora that their way of living is wrong and requests to change their lifestyle for future generations. Here angered Mallu Dora chides Krishna and necks out of the hamlet. After some time, Krishna returns as a Police officer and posted in the same area intentionally by Govt when he tries his best to put his men on the right path but fails. At a point in time, Krishna catches few mobsters including Naagu when furious Mallu Dora kidnaps some officials and seeks for the mortgage. During that time, severe Police encounter occurs in which all the dacoits die including Naagu, Malli, etc. At last, Krishna shows Mallu Dora their corpses makes him realize violence leaves nothing but annihilation. Finally, the movie ends affirming that non-violence is the supreme morality.

Cast 
Akkineni Nageswara Rao as Krishna / Kanna
Jamuna as Indira / Indu
S. V. Ranga Rao as Mallu Dora
Gummadi as Dr. Chandra Shekar
Jaggayya as Naagu
Nagabhushanam as Varaha Murthy
Rajababu as Anji
Prabhakar Reddy as Police officer
Mukkamala
Tyagaraju as Papanna
K. V. Chalam as Mr. America
Kanchana as Malli
Suryakantham as Sundaramma
Raja Sulochana as Dancer
Rama Prabha
Jayanthi as Lakshmi
Rukmini as Yashoda
Meena Kumari

Soundtrack 

Music composed by Pendyala Nageswara Rao.

Awards 
 K. S. Prakash Rao won Nandi Award for Best Story Writer (1968)

References

External links 
 

1960s Telugu-language films
1968 films
Films directed by K. S. Prakash Rao
Films scored by Pendyala Nageswara Rao
Indian action films
Indian black-and-white films